Tovino Thomas (born 21 January 1989) is an Indian actor and film producer who prominently works in Malayalam films. He made his debut in 2012 with the film Prabhuvinte Makkal. His breakthrough roles were in the films ABCD (2013), 7th Day (2014) and Ennu Ninte Moideen (2015). He starred as the titular character in the Netflix superhero film Minnal Murali (2021).

Tovino has co-produced the film Kilometers and Kilometers. On 21 January 2021, he launched his own production house - Tovino Thomas Productions. Kala is the first venture by his own production house where he also played the role of the antagonist.

He won the Filmfare Award for Best Supporting Actor for his performance in Ennu Ninte Moideen (2015). He also won the Kerala Film Critics Association Award and Filmfare Critics Award for Best Actor for his performance in Mayanadhi (2017). For his constantly evolving looks and style, Tovino is ranked among the most desirable men from Kerala as published by the Kochi Times, which, in 2018, ranked him first. In 2022, Tovino won the SIIMA Award for Best Actor, for Minnal Murali and Kala.

Early life 
Tovino was born into a Suriyani Nasrani Catholic family in Irinjalakuda, Thrissur as the younger son of Adv. Ellikkal Thomas and Sheela Thomas. His siblings are Tingston Thomas and Dhanya Thomas. He completed primary schooling from Don Bosco Higher Secondary School, Irinjalakuda and Secondary (Plus Two) schooling from St Mary's Higher Secondary School Irinjalakuda and graduated with bachelor's degree in electronics and communication engineering from Tamil Nadu College of Engineering, Coimbatore, Tamil Nadu. He was a part of the handball Team of Don Bosco High School and also helmed as the school leader. He later worked in Cognizant Technologies as a software engineer. He was active in sports, fitness and modeling.

Career
Tovino Thomas made his acting debut in Prabhuvinte Makkal directed by Sajeev Anthikkad in 2012. Subsequently, he worked as an assistant director in Roopesh Peethambaran's Theevram. In ABCD: American-Born Confused Desi (2013) he portrayed the role of the antagonist. Tovino appeared as the lead in the film Koothara which also featured Mohanlal. He played a lead role in Roopesh Peethambaran's second directorial venture You Too Brutus.

He has played major roles in the films including 7th Day (2014) and Charlie (2015). In 2015, he portrayed the role of Perumparambil Appu in the film Ennu Ninte Moideen which was widely appreciated and received critical acclaim for his performance. He won his first Filmfare Award for Best Supporting Actor for his performance in Ennu Ninte Moideen.

He played the role of Engineer Thejus Varky in Guppy (2016) which was well received by audiences upon the DVD and digital release. He won the New Sensational Hero Award at the NAFA 2017 for his performance in the film. This film was also a breakthrough in his career.

He played the lead role in Oru Mexican Aparatha, Godha, and Mayanadi in 2017. He won the Filmfare Critics Award for Best Actor and Behindwoods Critics Award for Best Actor for Mayanadi. The film was praised for the way it tackled with sexuality and was included in The Hindu's top 25 Malayalam films of the decade. The same year he appeared in Ezra in a major supporting role.

In 2018, Tovino Thomas was cast in a major role in Maari 2 with Dhanush which was his Tamil debut. His major Malayalam releases for the year includes Theevandi, Ente Ummante Peru, and Oru Kuprasidha Payyan. Tovino had major roles in Lucifer, Uyare and Virus in 2019. His film Uyare was released in South Korea, becoming the first Malayalam film to do so. His other releases in the year were And the Oscar Goes To..., Luca, Kalki, and Edakkad Battalion 06.

In 2020, he played the lead role in the crime thriller Forensic with Mamta Mohandas, which received a good response from the audience and was a major box office success.

In 2021, his first release was Kala which was his second venture as a producer. The film received critical acclaim for its narrative. Kaanekkaane released in 2021, received a positive response and critical acclaim for its narrative and performance by its cast.  He starred as the titular character in Minnal Murali, which is the first Malayalam superhero action film, released by Netflix on December 24. He received immense praise for his work in the movie and the movie was also declared as 'Streaming success' and surpassed the records of most viewed Malayalam Film on OTT previously held by Drishyam 2.

In 2022, Tovino appeared in Naaradan, Dear Friend, Vaashi and Thallumaala.

In his upcoming film Neelavelicham he portrays the role of Vaikom Muhammad Basheer.
The actor have a good social media management and web development team to update his movie details instantly.

Filmography 

All films are in Malayalam language unless otherwise noted.

As actor

As singer

As producer

Awards and nominations

Personal life 
Tovino married his longtime girlfriend, Lidiya at St. Thomas Cathedral, Irinjalakuda, on 25 October 2014. The duo had met during their school days and married after nine years The couple has a daughter and a son born in 2016 and 2020 respectively.

Tovino had volunteered during 2018 Kerala floods to lead rescue and rehabilitation missions. In 2021, Tovino received golden visa from Government of UAE

Initiatives 

Tovino Thomas was a part of the handball team at Don Bosco High School, Irinjalakuda during his high school years. As a part of the team, he has participated in junior and sub-junior levels. He was also the team captain at Don Bosco High School, Irinjalakuda. Tovino had also competed at district and state levels representing Thrissur during his years when he was active at handball.

Currently, Tovino is active alongside former members of the team to develop the sport in Kerala and is honored as the goodwill ambassador by Kerala Handball Association.

In 2021, Tovino is announced as the ambassador of the Samoohika Sannadhasena, the community volunteer program launched by the Government of Kerala. The community volunteer program was launched to tackle natural disasters by imparting training to volunteers and provide aid to the public in times of crisis. Pinarayi Vijayan, Chief Minister of Kerala appreciated Tovino's involvement in flood relief activities and noted that his presence will influence the youth to join in the community volunteer program.

After Mammootty and Mohanlal, Tovino became the third Malayalam film actor to receive the Golden Visa issued by the United Arab Emirates.

Notes

References

External links 

 
 

1989 births
21st-century Indian male actors
Don Bosco schools alumni
Indian male film actors
Living people
Male actors from Kerala
Male actors in Malayalam cinema
People from Irinjalakuda
People from Thrissur
People from Thrissur district
Male actors from Thrissur
Syro-Malabar Catholics